An indirect presidential election was held in South Africa on 6 May 2009 following the general election on 22 April 2009. Jacob Zuma of the ruling African National Congress won the election with 277 votes (13 more than the number of seats held by the ANC), while Mvume Dandala of the Congress of the People got 47 votes. The 67 members of the official opposition Democratic Alliance abstained from voting.

References 

Presidential election
Presidential election
2009